Josep Guijarro Triadó (Terrassa, 1967) is a Spanish writer, ufologist and journalist. In 2006, he was the director and conductor of the programme  Enigmes i Misteris Radio Nacional de España. He collaborates with the TV programme Channel nº4 in Cuatro, and was editor-in-chief of the magazines Más allá, and director of KARMA 7.

Works
Infiltrados, seres de otras dimensiones entre nosotros (Sangrilá, 1994), 
Guía de la Cataluña mágica (Martínez Roca, 1999), 
El tesoro oculto de los templarios (Martínez Roca, 2001) 
Gótica (Aguilar, 2005) 
Rex Mundi (Aguilar, 2006) 
 In-Creíble (Libros Cúpula, 2013) 
 Guia fantàstica de Catalunya (Angle Editorial, 2013) 
 Coincidencias Imposibles (Libros Cúpula, 2014)

References

Spanish male writers
1967 births
Living people
People from Terrassa